is an EP by Japanese rock band Malice Mizer, released on February 1, 2000. It is dedicated to the band's former drummer Kami, who died the previous year and composed two of its songs.

Overview
Kami had been wanting to start composing songs for a while, he would practice guitar and bought a synthesizer for that purpose. When he died in June 1999, rather than hold a public memorial service for him, the remaining members chose to finish and release two of his songs that they felt best conveyed the drummer's feelings. They waited to release it on February 1 of the following year, which is Kami's birthday.

Kami first showed the band the songs in April 1999, the first time he had ever shown them his compositions. They were already titled. Mana described the two tracks as polar opposites. The guitarist described "Unmei no Deai", which Kami said had a French-like image, as having a "gentleness" that Malice Mizer had never done before. It was the most difficult song on the EP, and undertook a significant change while they arranged it.

Mana felt that "Mori no Naka no Tenshi" was brighter and said it has a "fun feeling." Wanting to keep that happy and energetic feeling, the band did not want a tightly arranged guitar part. It also marks the first time that Mana and Közi had played/recorded guitar in a while. The remaining members composed the opening track "Saikai" to show their feelings for Kami.

In the album booklet, the two songs have French "image lyrics". Malice Mizer wrote these based on the titles that Kami gave the songs. However, only "Unmei no Deai" has an audible vocal track. Kami is credited as "Eternal Blood Relative", and would continue to be on all of Malice Mizer's subsequent releases. The cover illustration is of a blue morpho, as Kami was known for his love of butterflies. Shinwa is a box set, with a VHS containing video footage from some of their concerts set to the songs contained on the EP.

Track listing

Personnel
 Malice Mizer
 Kami – eternal blood relative
 Hitoshi Konno – violin
 Motohide Tanaka – director
 Nobuhiko Nakayama – synthesizer programming and sound design
 Yoichiro Kano – recording and mixing
 Masao Nakazato – mastering

References

Malice Mizer albums
2000 EPs
EPs published posthumously
Japanese-language EPs